During the 2015–16 Belgian football season, Club Brugge competed in the Belgian Pro League.

First team squad

Competitions

Results

Belgian Pro League

Regular season

Championship play-offs

Belgian Cup

UEFA Europa League

References

External links
Club website

Club Brugge KV seasons
Club Brugge
Belgian football championship-winning seasons